In 2006, the Los Angeles Dodgers looked to improve their record from 2005. The team switched General Managers from Paul DePodesta to Ned Colletti, and hired Grady Little as the new manager. This was also their first season to be broadcast on KCAL-TV (9). The Dodgers won 88 games and the National League wild card. In the first round of the playoffs the Dodgers dropped three straight games to the New York Mets, ending their season.

Offseason
December 13, 2005: Acquired Andre Ethier from the Oakland Athletics for Milton Bradley and Antonio Perez.
December 19, 2005: Signed free agent Nomar Garciaparra.
January 4, 2006: Acquired Jae Seo and Tim Hamulack from the New York Mets for Duaner Sánchez and Steve Schmoll.
January 14, 2006: Acquired Danys Báez and Lance Carter from the Tampa Bay Devil Rays for Edwin Jackson and Chuck Tiffany.

Regular season

Season standings

National League West

Record vs. opponents

Game log

|- style="background: #fbb;"
| 1 || April 3 ||  Atlanta Braves || 11-10 || Villarreal (1-0) || Lowe (0-1) || Reitsma (1) || 56,000 || 0-1
|- style="background: #bfb;"
| 2 || April 4 ||  Atlanta Braves || 4-5 || Penny (1-0) || Smoltz (0-1) || Báez (1) || 36,249 || 1-1
|- style="background: #fbb;"
| 3 || April 5 ||  Atlanta Braves || 9-8 || Villarreal (2-0) || Osoria (0-1) || Reitsma (2) || 35,292 || 1-2
|- style="background: #bfb;"
| 4 || April 7 || @ Philadelphia Phillies || 5-3 || Tomko (1-0) || Floyd (0-1) || Báez (2) || 25,518 || 2-2
|- style="background: #bbb;"
| -- || April 8 || @ Philadelphia Phillies || 3:05pm ||colspan=5| PPD, RAIN; rescheduled for April 9
|- style="background: #fbb;"
| 5 || April 9 || @ Philadelphia Phillies || 3-6 || Gordon (1-1) || Hamulack (0-1) || None || – || 2-3
|- style="background: #bfb;"
| 6 || April 9 || @ Philadelphia Phillies || 6-2 || Penny (2-0) || Lieber (0-2) || None || 38,056 || 3-3
|- style="background: #bfb;" 
| 7 || April 10 || @ Pittsburgh Pirates || 8-3 || Pérez (1-0) || Duke (0-1) || None || 39,129 || 4-3
|- style="background: #fbb;"
| 8 || April 11 || @ Pittsburgh Pirates || 6-7 || Torres (1-1) || Carter (0-1) || Gonzalez (1) || 17,240 || 4-4
|- style="background: #fbb;"
| 9 || April 12 || @ Pittsburgh Pirates || 5-9 || Torres (2-1) || Kuo (0-1) || None || 13,237 || 4-5
|- style="background: #bfb;"
| 10 || April 13 || @ Pittsburgh Pirates || 13-5 || Lowe (1-1) || Pérez (0-2) || None || 18,134 || 5-5
|- style="background: #fbb;"
| 11 || April 14 ||  San Francisco Giants || 2-1 || Wright || Kuo (0-2) || Worrell (4) || 45,940 || 5-6
|- style="background: #bfb;"
| 12 || April 15 ||  San Francisco Giants || 1-3 || Pérez (2-0) || Schmidt (0-2) || Báez (3) || 55,132 || 6-6
|- style="background: #fbb;"
| 13 || April 16 ||  San Francisco Giants || 2-0 || Hennessey (1-0) || Seo (0-1) || Worrell (5) || 47,024 || 6-7
|- style="background: #fbb;"
| 14 || April 17 ||  Chicago Cubs || 4-1 || Maddux (3-0) || Tomko (1-1) || Dempster (3) || 33,551 || 6-8
|- style="background: #bfb;"
| 15 || April 18 ||  Chicago Cubs || 1-2 || Saito (1-0) || Ohman (1-1) || None || 37,340 || 7-8
|- style="background: #fbb;"
| 16 || April 19 ||  Chicago Cubs || 5-4 || Williamson (2-0) || Báez (0-1) || Dempster (4) || 41,288 || 7-9
|- style="background: #bfb;"
| 17 || April 21 ||  Arizona Diamondbacks || 3-6 || Pérez (3-0) || Hernandez (1-3) || Daez (4) || 44,294 || 8-9
|- style="background: #fbb;"
| 18 || April 22 ||  Arizona Diamondbacks || 5-4 || Batista (2-0) || Seo (0-2) || Valverde (3) || 51,878 || 8-10
|- style="background: #bfb;"
| 19 || April 23 ||  Arizona Diamondbacks || 4-6 || Tomko (2-1) || Ortiz (0-3) || Báez (5) || 48,394 || 9-10
|- style="background: #bfb;"
| 20 || April 24 || @ Houston Astros || 6-2 || Saito (2-0) || Lidge (0-1) || Báez (6) || 28,382 || 10-10
|- style="background: #fbb;"
| 21 || April 25 || @ Houston Astros || 3-4  || Astacio (2-0) || Kuo (0-3) || None || 30,451 || 10-11
|- style="background: #fbb;"
| 22 || April 26 || @ Houston Astros || 5-8 || Rodríguez (4-0) || Pérez (3-1) || None || 32,874 || 10-12
|- style="background: #bfb;"
| 23 || April 28 || @ San Diego Padres || 3-0 || Seo (1-2) || Young (2-2) || Báez (7) || 36,435 || 11-12
|- style="background: #bfb;"
| 24 || April 29 || @ San Diego Padres || 4-2 || Tomko (3-1) || Hensley (1-2) || Báez (8) || 44,337 || 12-12
|- style="background: #fbb;"
| 25 || April 30 || @ San Diego Padres || 5-6  || Linebrink (2-2) || Hamulack (0-2) || None || 38,116 || 12-13

|- style="background: #fbb;"
| 26 || May 1 || @ Arizona Diamondbacks || 2-3 || Vargas (3-1) || Penny (2-1) || Valverde (6) || 20,100 || 12-14
|- style="background: #fbb;"
| 27 || May 2 || @ Arizona Diamondbacks || 8-10 || Vizcaino (1-2) || Saito (2-1) || Valverde (7) || 23,216 || 12-15
|- style="background: #fbb;"
| 28 || May 3 ||  San Diego Padres || 11-5 || Cassidy (1-0) || Osoria (0-2) || None || 33,352 || 12-16
|- style="background: #fbb;"
| 29 || May 4 ||  San Diego Padres || 3-0 || Embree (1-0) || Saito (2-2) || Hoffman (5) || 34,137 ||  12-17
|- style="background: #bfb;"
| 30 || May 5 ||  Milwaukee Brewers || 3-4 || Báez (1-1) || Wise (2-2) || None || 47,731 || 13-17
|- style="background: #bfb;"
| 31 || May 6 ||  Milwaukee Brewers || 4-5 || Báez (2-1) || Demaria (0-1) || None || 46,087 || 14-17
|- style="background: #bfb;"
| 32 || May 7 ||  Milwaukee Brewers || 2-10 || Sele (1-0) || Bush (2-4) || None || 53,528 || 15-17
|- style="background: #bfb;"
| 33 || May 9 ||  Houston Astros || 7-12 || Saito (3-2) || Wheeler (0-2) || None || 55,992 || 16-17
|- style="background: #bfb;"
| 34 || May 10 ||  Houston Astros || 6-9 || Tomko (4-1) || Buchholz (2-2) || None || 33,595 || 17-17
|- style="background: #fbb;"
| 35 || May 11 ||  Houston Astros || 4-2 || Rodríguez (5-1) || Lowe (1-2) || Wheeler (1) || 37,133 || 17-18
|- style="background: #bfb;"
| 36 || May 12 || @ San Francisco Giants || 6-1 || Penny (3-1) || Morris (2-4) || None || 42,885 || 18-18
|- style="background: #fbb;"
| 37 || May 13 || @ San Francisco Giants || 5-6 || Benítez (2-0) || Báez (2-2) || None || 42,864 || 18-19
|- style="background: #bfb;"
| 38 || May 14 || @ San Francisco Giants || 6-3 || Pérez (4-1) || Kline (1-1) || Beimel (1) || 42,985 || 19-19
|- style="background: #bfb;"
| 39 || May 15 || @ Colorado Rockies || 5-4 || Tomko (5-1) || Ramírez (2-1) || Saito (1) || 20,208 || 20-19
|- style="background: #fbb;"
| 40 || May 16 || @ Colorado Rockies || 1-5 || Kim (2-1) || Lowe (1-3) || None || 23,192 || 20-20
|- style="background: #bfb;"
| 41 || May 17 || @ Colorado Rockies || 3-2 || Penny (4-1) || Jennings (2-4) || Báez (9) || 30,296 || 21-20
|- style="background: #bfb;"
| 42 || May 19 ||  Los Angeles Angels || 3-16 || Sele (2-0) || Weaver (1-7) || None || 55,655 || 22-20
|- style="background: #bfb;"
| 43 || May 20 ||  Los Angeles Angels || 4-8 || Beimel (1-0) || Shields (1-3) || None || 55,587 || 23-20
|- style="background: #bfb;"
| 44 || May 21 ||  Los Angeles Angels || 0-7 || Lowe (2-3) || Santana (4-2) || None || 55,662 || 24-20
|- style="background: #bfb;"
| 45 || May 22 ||  Colorado Rockies || 1-6 || Seo (2-2) || Kim (2-2) || None || 33,652 || 25-20
|- style="background: #bfb;"
| 46 || May 23 ||  Colorado Rockies || 1-8 || Penny (5-1) || Jennings (2-5) || None || 40,228 || 26-20
|- style="background: #bfb;"
| 47 || May 24 ||  Colorado Rockies || 1-7 || Sele (3-0) || Cook (5-4) || None || 39,299 || 27-20
|- style="background: #fbb;"
| 48 || May 26 || @ Washington Nationals || 4-10 || Hernández (3-5) || Tomko (5-2) || None || 22,712 || 27-21
|- style="background: #bfb;"
| 49 || May 27 || @ Washington Nationals || 3-1 || Lowe (3-3) || Stanton (1-5) || Saito (2) || 26,867 || 28-21
|- style="background: #fbb;"
| 50 || May 28 || @ Washington Nationals || 4-10 || Ortiz (3-4) || Seo (2-3) || None || 30,348 || 28-22
|- style="background: #bfb;"
| 51 || May 29 || @ Atlanta Braves || 12-5 || Beimel (2-0) || Thomson (2-4) || None || 41,825 || 29-22
|- style="background: #bfb;"
| 52 || May 30 || @ Atlanta Braves || 8-3 || Báez (3-2) || Remlinger (2-3) || None || 29,517 || 30-22
|- style="background: #fbb;"
| 53 || May 31 || @ Atlanta Braves || 3-9 || Hudson (5-3) || Tomko (5-3) || None || 28,880 || 30-23

|- style="background: #bfb;"
| 54 || June 1 ||  Philadelphia Phillies || 2-7 || Lowe (4-3) || Floyd (4-3) || None || 38,643 || 31-23
|- style="background: #fbb;"
| 55 || June 2 ||  Philadelphia Phillies || 8-6 || Geary (2-0) || Báez (3-3) || Gordon (16) || 55,142 || 31-24
|- style="background: #bfb;"
| 56 || June 3 ||  Philadelphia Phillies || 2-8 || Penny (6-1) || Brito (0-1) || None || 46,561 || 32-24
|- style="background: #fbb;"
| 57 || June 4 ||  Philadelphia Phillies || 6-4 || Geary (3-0) || Beimel (2-1) || Gordon (17) || 48,270 || 32-25
|- style="background: #fbb;"
| 58 || June 5 ||  New York Mets || 4-1 || Soler (1-1) || Tomko (5-4) || Bradford (1) || 34,420 || 32-26
|- style="background: #bfb;"
| 59 || June 6 ||  New York Mets || 5-8 || Lowe (5-3) || Martínez (5-2) || Gagné (1) || 46,347 || 33-26
|- style="background: #fbb;"
| 60 || June 7 ||  New York Mets || 9-7 || Glavine (9-2) || Pérez (4-2) || Wagner (12) || 44,320 || 33-27
|- style="background: #bfb;"
| 61 || June 9 || @ Colorado Rockies || 3-0 || Penny (7-1) || Kim (3-4) || Saito (3) || 30,455 || 34-27
|- style="background: #fbb;"
| 62 || June 10 || @ Colorado Rockies || 9-12 || Jennings (4-6) || Tomko (5-5) || Fuentes (13) || 35,557 || 34-28
|- style="background: #bfb;"
| 63 || June 11 || @ Colorado Rockies || 6-5 || Báez (4-3) || Fuentes (1-1) || Saito (4) || 29,221 || 35-28
|- style="background: #fbb;"
| 64 || June 13 || @ San Diego Padres || 1-9 || Park (4-3) || Sele (3-1) || None || 30,371 || 35-29
|- style="background: #fbb;"
| 65 || June 14 || @ San Diego Padres || 3-5 || Linebrink (3-2) || Kuo (0-4) || Hoffman (15) || 30,011 || 35-30
|- style="background: #bfb;"
| 66 || June 15 || @ San Diego Padres || 7-3 || Broxton (1-0) || Sikorski (0-1) || None || 33,382 || 36-30
|- style="background: #fbb;"
| 67 || June 16 || @ Oakland Athletics || 3-7 || Zito (8-3) || Tomko (5-6) || None || 30,161 || 36-31
|- style="background: #fbb;"
| 68 || June 17 || @ Oakland Athletics || 4-5  || Karsay (1-0) || Seo (2-4) || None || 35,077 || 36-32
|- style="background: #fbb;"
| 69 || June 18 || @ Oakland Athletics || 2-5 || Blanton (7-6) || Sele (3-2) || Street (17) || 35,077 || 36-33
|- style="background: #fbb;"
| 70 || June 20 ||  Seattle Mariners || 9-4 || Piñeiro (6-7) || Penny (7-2) || Soriano (2) || 43,949 || 36-34
|- style="background: #fbb;"
| 71 || June 21 ||  Seattle Mariners || 8-5 || Mateo (4-0) || Báez (4-4) || Putz (12) || 40,419 || 36-35
|- style="background: #bfb;"
| 72 || June 22 ||  Seattle Mariners || 2-4 || Lowe (6-3) || Hernández (7-7) || None || 46,207 || 37-35
|- style="background: #bfb;"
| 73 || June 23 ||  Pittsburgh Pirates || 4-10 || Tomko (6-6) || Pérez (2-10) || None || 55,823 || 38-35
|- style="background: #bfb;"
| 74 || June 24 ||  Pittsburgh Pirates || 0-7 || Sele (4-2) || Duke (5-7) || None || 47,785 || 39-35
|- style="background: #bfb;"
| 75 || June 25 ||  Pittsburgh Pirates || 4-7 || Penny (8-2) || Wells (0-2) || Saito (5) || 55,545 || 40-35
|- style="background: #fbb;"
| 76 || June 26 || @ Minnesota Twins || 2-8 || Silva (4-8) || Billingsley (0-1) || None || 22,528 || 40-36
|- style="background: #fbb;"
| 77 || June 27 || @ Minnesota Twins || 2-9 || Liriano (8-1) || Lowe (6-4) || None || 30,681 || 40-37
|- style="background: #fbb;"
| 78 || June 28 || @ Minnesota Twins || 3-6 || Santana (9-4) || Pérez (4-3) || Nathan (13) || 34,157 || 40-38
|- style="background: #bfb;"
| 79 || June 30 || @ Los Angeles Angels || 6-1 || Penny (9-2) || Colon (0-4) || None || 44,233 || 41-38

|- style="background: #fbb;"
| 80 || July 1 || @ Los Angeles Angels || 2-9 || Escobar (6-9) || Hendrickson (4-9) || None || 43,891 || 41-39
|- style="background: #fbb;"
| 81 || July 2 || @ Los Angeles Angels || 0-4 || Lackey (6-5) || Billingsley (0-2) || None || 44,223 || 41-40
|- style="background: #bfb;"
| 82 || July 3 ||  Arizona Diamondbacks || 4-10 || Lowe (7-4) || Cruz (3-4) || None || 47,698 || 42-40
|- style="background: #bfb;"
| 83 || July 4 ||  Arizona Diamondbacks || 3-11 || Sele (5-2) || Gonzalez (2-2) || None || 55,816 || 43-40
|- style="background: #bfb;"
| 84 || July 5 ||  Arizona Diamondbacks || 4-5 || Penny (10-2) || Vargas (7-5) || Saito (6) || 38,505 || 44-40
|- style="background: #fbb;"
| 85 || July 6 ||  San Francisco Giants || 5-4 || Hennessey (4-1) || Hendrickson (4-10) || Benítez (9) || 42,515 || 44-41
|- style="background: #bfb;"
| 86 || July 7 ||  San Francisco Giants || 7-9 || Báez (5-4) || Accardo (1-3) || Saito (7) || 53,991 || 45-41
|- style="background: #fbb;"
| 87 || July 8 ||  San Francisco Giants || 11-7 || Lowry (4-5) || Lowe (7-5) || Benítez (10) || 46,496 || 45-42
|- style="background: #bfb;"
| 88 || July 9 ||  San Francisco Giants || 1-3 || Sele (6-2) || Schmidt (6-5) || Saito (8) || 41,849 || 46-42
|- style="background: #fbb;"
| 89 || July 13 || @ St. Louis Cardinals || 2-3  || Looper (5-1) || Pérez (4-4) || None || 45,156 || 46-43
|- style="background: #fbb;"
| 90 || July 14 || @ St. Louis Cardinals || 0-5 || Carpenter (8-4) || Lowe (7-6) || None || 45,704 || 46-44
|- style="background: #fbb;"
| 91 || July 15 || @ St. Louis Cardinals || 1-2  || Looper (6-1) || Báez (5-5) || None || 46,068 || 46-45
|- style="background: #fbb;"
| 92 || July 16 || @ St. Louis Cardinals || 3-11 || Reyes (2-3) || Penny (10-3) || None || 44,741 || 46-46
|- style="background: #fbb;" 
| 93 || July 17 || @ Arizona Diamondbacks || 3-8 || González (3-2) || Sele (6-3) || None || 23,513 || 46-47
|- style="background: #bfb;"
| 94 || July 18 || @ Arizona Diamondbacks || 4-1 || Billingsley (1-2) || Cruz (3-5) || None || 27,478 || 47-47
|- style="background: #fbb;"
| 95 || July 19 || @ Arizona Diamondbacks || 0-8 || Batista (9-5) || Lowe (7-7) || None || 23,616 || 47-48
|- style="background: #fbb;"
| 96 || July 20 || @ Arizona Diamondbacks || 2-5 || Webb (11-3) || Hendrickson (4-11) || Julio (11) || 25,329 || 47-49
|- style="background: #fbb;"
| 97 || July 21 ||  St. Louis Cardinals || 2-0 || Suppan (7-5) || Penny (10-4) || Isringhausen (27) || 47,987 || 47-50
|- style="background: #fbb;"
| 98 || July 22 ||  St. Louis Cardinals || 6-1 || Weaver (4-11) || Sele (6-4) || None || 50,438 || 47-51
|- style="background: #fbb;"
| 99 || July 23 ||  St. Louis Cardinals || 6-1 || Marquis (12-7) || Billingsley (1-3) || None || 43,650 || 47-52
|- style="background: #fbb;"
| 100 || July 24 ||  San Diego Padres || 7-6  || Brocail (1-0) || Carrara (0-1) || Hoffman (27) || 38,050 || 47-53
|- style="background: #fbb;"
| 101 || July 25 ||  San Diego Padres || 7-3 || Park (7-6) || Hendrickson (4-12) || None || 51,334 || 47-54
|- style="background: #fbb;"
| 102 || July 26 ||  San Diego Padres || 10-3 || Peavy (5-10) || Penny (10-5) || None || 44,181 || 47-55
|- style="background: #bfb;"
| 103 || July 28 ||  Washington Nationals || 1-13 || Billingsley (2-3) || Armas (7-6) || None || 55,825 || 48-55
|- style="background: #bfb;"
| 104 || July 29 ||  Washington Nationals || 5-7 || Lowe (8-7) || O'Connor (3-7) || Broxton (1) || 41,540 || 49-55
|- style="background: #bfb;"
| 105 || July 30 ||  Washington Nationals || 3-4 || Broxton (2-0) || Rauch (3-2) || Saito (9) || 43,346 || 50-55

|- style="background: #bfb;"
| 106 || August 1 || @ Cincinnati Reds || 10-4 || Sele (7-4) || Bray (2-2) || None || 25,127 || 51-55
|- style="background: #bfb;"
| 107 || August 2 || @ Cincinnati Reds || 5-3 || Penny (11-5) |||| Saito (10) || 22,114 ||52-55
|- style="background: #bfb;"
| 108 || August 3 || @ Cincinnati Reds || 3-0 || Maddux (10-11) || Milton (7-7) || Saito (11) || 26,045 || 53-55
|- style="background: #bfb;"
| 109 || August 4 || @ Florida Marlins || 6-2 || Lowe (9-7) || Sánchez (4-2) || None || 15,416 || 54-55
|- style="background: #bfb;"
| 110 || August 5 || @ Florida Marlins || 10-2 || Billingsley (3-3) || Johnson (9-6) || None || 17,863 || 55-55
|- style="background: #bfb;"
| 111 || August 6 || @ Florida Marlins || 7-3 || Hendrickson (5-12) || Olsen (9-5) || None || 14,182 || 56-55
|- style="background: #bfb;"
| 112 || August 7 ||  Colorado Rockies || 2-7 || Penny (12-5) || Fogg (7-7) || None || 44,593 || 57-55
|- style="background: #bfb;"
| 113 || August 8 ||  Colorado Rockies || 2-4 || Tomko (7-6) || Kim (7-7) || Saito (12) || 50,210 || 58-55
|- style="background: #fbb;"
| 114 || August 9 ||  Colorado Rockies || 3-1 || Affeldt (6-6) || Lowe (9-8) || Fuentes (23) || 46,643 || 58-56
|- style="background: #bfb;"
| 115 || August 10 ||  Colorado Rockies || 3-4 || Saito (4-2) || Mesa (0-5) || None || 48,699 || 59-56
|- style="background: #bfb;"
| 116 || August 11 ||  San Francisco Giants || 2-3 || Tomko (8-6) || Stanton (3-6) || Broxton (2) || 53,695 || 60-56
|- style="background: #bfb;"
| 117 || August 12 ||  San Francisco Giants || 5-6 || Penny (13-5) || Cain (8-9) || Saito (13) || 46,444 || 61-56
|- style="background: #bfb;"
| 118 || August 13 ||  San Francisco Giants || 0-1  || Saito (5-2) || Chulk (1-1) || None || 55,699 || 62-56
|- style="background: #bfb;"
| 119 || August 14 ||  Florida Marlins || 2-4 || Lowe (10-8) || Willis (7-10) || Giovanni Carrara (1) || 44,749 || 63-56
|- style="background: #bfb;"
| 120 || August 15 ||  Florida Marlins || 0-4 || Billingsley (4-3) || Messenger (1-7) || None || 47,960 || 64-56
|- style="background: #fbb;"
| 121 || August 16 ||  Florida Marlins || 15-4 || Johnson (11-6) || Hendrickson (5-13) || None || 38,185 || 64-57
|- style="background: #fbb;"
| 122 || August 18 || @ San Francisco Giants || 3-7 || Schmidt (10-7) || Penny (13-6) || None || 42,862 || 64-58
|- style="background: #bfb;"
| 123 || August 19 || @ San Francisco Giants || 14-7 || Maddux (11-11) || Hennessey (5-3) || None || 42,833 || 65-58
|- style="background: #bfb;"
| 124 || August 20 || @ San Francisco Giants || 5-2 || Lowe (11-8) || Morris (8-11) || Saito (14) || 42,052 || 66-58
|- style="background: #fbb;"
| 125 || August 21 || @ San Diego Padres || 2-4 || Stauffer (1-0) || Dessens (5-8) || Hoffman (32) || 33,244 || 66-59
|- style="background: #fbb;"
| 126 || August 22 || @ San Diego Padres || 0-1 || Peavy (7-12) || Hendrickson (5-14) || Hoffman (33) || 32,774 || 66-60
|- style="background: #fbb;"
| 127 || August 23 || @ San Diego Padres || 2-7 || Williams (7-4) || Penny (13-7) || None || 36,613 || 66-61
|- style="background: #fbb;"
| 128 || August 25 || @ Arizona Diamondbacks || 7-9  || Lyon (2-3) || Sele (7-5) || None || 26,293 || 66-62
|- style="background: #bfb;"
| 129 || August 26 || @ Arizona Diamondbacks || 4-3 || Broxton (3-0) || Vizcaíno (3-4) || Saito (15) || 40,388 || 67-62
|- style="background: #bfb;"
| 130 || August 27 || @ Arizona Diamondbacks || 6-3 || Billingsley (5-3) || Hernández (10-11) || Saito (16) || 30,350 || 68-62
|- style="background: #bfb;"
| 131 || August 28 ||  Cincinnati Reds || 5-6 || Penny (14-7) || Michalak (1-2) || Broxton (3) || 44,176 || 69-62
|- style="background: #bfb;"
| 132 || August 29 ||  Cincinnati Reds || 5-6  || Lowe (12-8) || Franklin (5-7) || None || 44,697 || 70-62
|- style="background: #bfb;"
| 133 || August 30 ||  Cincinnati Reds || 3-7 || Maddux (12-11) || Harang (13-10) || None || 47,356 || 71-62

|- style="background: #bfb;"
| 134 || September 1 ||  Colorado Rockies || 3-6 || Lowe (13-8) || Jennings (7-12) || Saito (17) || 49,601 || 72-62
|- style="background: #bfb;"
| 135 || September 2 ||  Colorado Rockies || 5-14 || Penny (15-7) || Cook (9-13) || None || 48,984 || 73-62
|- style="background: #fbb;"
| 136 || September 3 ||  Colorado Rockies || 12-5 || Kim (8-10) || Sele (7-6) || None || 44,895 || 73-63
|- style="background: #fbb;"
| 137 || September 4 || @ Milwaukee Brewers || 3-6 || Bush (10-10) || Maddux (12-12) || Cordero (17) || 33,645 || 73-64
|- style="background: #fbb;"
| 138 || September 5 || @ Milwaukee Brewers || 0-9 || Davis (10-9) || Hendrickson (5-15) || None || 13,427 || 73-65
|- style="background: #bfb;"
| 139 || September 6 || @ Milwaukee Brewers || 2-1 || Lowe (14-8) || Capuano (11-10) || Saito (18) || 25,106 || 74-65
|- style="background: #fbb;"
| 140 || September 7 || @ New York Mets || 0-7 || Glavine (13-6) || Penny (15-8) || None || 48,583 || 74-66
|- style="background: #bfb;"
| 141 || September 8 || @ New York Mets || 5-0 || Kuo (1-4) || Maine (5-4) || None || 52,077 || 75-66
|- style="background: #fbb;"
| 142 || September 9 || @ New York Mets || 2-3 || Hernández (10-10) || Maddux (12-13) || Wagner (36) || 47,064 || 75-67
|- style="background: #bfb;"
| 143 || September 10 || @ New York Mets || 9-1 || Stults (1-0) || Trachsel (14-7) || None || 48,760 || 76-67
|- style="background: #fbb;"
| 144 || September 12 || @ Chicago Cubs || 8-9  || Aardsman (2-0) || Hamulack (0-3) || None || 35,618 || 76-68
|- style="background: #bfb;"
| 145 || September 13 || @ Chicago Cubs || 6-0 || Penny (16-8) || Guzman (0-6) || None || 35,868 || 77-68
|- style="background: #fbb;"
| 146 || September 14 || @ Chicago Cubs || 5-6 || Eyre (1-2) || Tomko (8-7) || Howry (5) || 31,361 || 77-69
|- style="background: #bfb;"
| 147 || September 15 ||  San Diego Padres || 1-3 || Maddux (13-13) || Wells (2-4) || Saito (19) || 52,911 || 78-69
|- style="background: #fbb;"
| 148 || September 16 ||  San Diego Padres || 11-2 || Williams (9-5) || Billingsley (5-4) || Sweeney (2) || 55,781 || 78-70
|- style="background: #fbb;"
| 149 || September 17 ||  San Diego Padres || 1-2 || Linebrink (7-3) || Broxton (3-1) || Hoffman (39) || 54,601 || 78-71
|- style="background: #bfb;"
| 150 || September 18 ||  San Diego Padres || 11-10  || Sele (8-6) || Seánez (3-3) || None || 55,831 || 79-71
|- style="background: #fbb;"
| 151 || September 19 ||  Pittsburgh Pirates || 10-6 || Snell (8-6) || Kuo (1-5) || None || 43,734 || 79-72
|- style="background: #fbb;"
| 152 || September 20 ||  Pittsburgh Pirates || 6-4 || Chacón (7-6) || Maddux (13-14) || Torres (10) || 46,319 || 79-73
|- style="background: #bfb;"
| 153 || September 21 ||  Pittsburgh Pirates || 2-5 || Billingsley (6-4) || Youman (0-2) || Saito (20) || 48,567 || 80-73
|- style="background: #bfb;"
| 154 || September 22 ||  Arizona Diamondbacks || 0-2 || Lowe (15-8) || Vargas (11-10) || Saito (21) || 43,990 || 81-73
|- style="background: #fbb;"
| 155 || September 23 ||  Arizona Diamondbacks || 9-3 || Batista (11-7) || Penny (16-9) || None || 49,791 || 81-74
|- style="background: #bfb;"
| 156 || September 24 ||  Arizona Diamondbacks || 1-5 || Saito (6-2) || Vizcaino (4-6) || None || 49,822 || 82-74
|- style="background: #bfb;"
| 157 || September 26 || @ Colorado Rockies || 11-4 || Maddux (14-14) || Jennings (9-13) || None || 20,133 || 83-74
|- style="background: #bfb;"
| 158 || September 27 || @ Colorado Rockies || 6-4 || Lowe (16-8) || Cook (9-15) || Saito (22) || 18,858 || 84-74
|- style="background: #bfb;"
| 159 || September 28 || @ Colorado Rockies || 19-11 || Hendrickson (6-15) || King (1-4) || None || 21,154 || 85-74
|- style="background: #bfb;"
| 160 || September 29 || @ San Francisco Giants || 4-3 || Broxton (4-1) || Stanton (7-7) || Saito (23) || 42,587 || 86-74
|- style="background: #bfb;"
| 161 || September 30 || @ San Francisco Giants || 4-2 || Maddux (15-14) || Cain (13-12) || Saito (24) || 42,769 || 87-74

|- style="background: #bfb;"
| 162 || October 1 || @ San Francisco Giants || 4-3 || Billingsley (7-4) || Hennessey (5-6) || Beimel (2) || 42,831 || 88-74

Season summary
After a season battling injuries to team leaders Jeff Kent and all-star Nomar Garciaparra, the Dodgers were able to produce with several young rookies such as Russell Martin, Andre Ethier, James Loney, Chad Billingsley, and Jonathan Broxton.  Key reliever Yhency Brazobán was sidelined with Tommy John surgery, and closer Éric Gagné was sidelined with a back injury.  However, rookie pitcher Takashi Saito took over the closing role and instantly became one of the game's best closers, ending the season with 24 saves in just half of the season.

Los Angeles had a very streaky season in 2006. After they started just 12–17, the Dodgers went on to win 15 of their next 18 games to improve to 27-20. They were 46-42 at the all-star break, two games back of the San Diego Padres in a tough division (all five teams in the N.L. West were .500 or better at the all-star break). Two Dodger players, Nomar Garciaparra, and Brad Penny, were selected to play in the All-Star Game.

After the all-star break, the Dodgers lost 13 of their first 14 games. As a result, their record dropped to 47–55, and they were in last place in the N.L. West, 7½ games out of first place. Los Angeles bounded back from this losing streak to win 17 out of their next 18 games, the first time the Dodgers did so since 1899. At the end of this winning stretch, Los Angeles was in first place with a record of 64–56. During this stretch, the Dodgers acquired Wilson Betemit from the Atlanta Braves, Julio Lugo from the Tampa Bay Devil Rays, and pitcher Greg Maddux from the Chicago Cubs. Maddux proved to be the biggest transition for the Dodgers, as he provided the Dodgers' starting rotation with a veteran arm and pitching depth.

The highlight of the 2006 season for Los Angeles was on September 18, against the San Diego Padres. Coming into the four-game series, Los Angeles held a half game lead in the N.L. West over San Diego with two and a half weeks left in the season. Los Angeles won the first game of the series 3–1 after a strong pitching performance by Maddux, extending the Dodgers' lead to a 1½ games over San Diego. The second game of the series was an 11–2 rout in favor of San Diego, trimming the Dodgers lead back to a half game. The third game of the series was a pitchers' duel between San Diego's Chris Young and the Dodgers Derek Lowe. San Diego scored first after Russell Branyan hit a solo home run to make it 1-0. Russell Martin tied the game at 1-1 with a solo home run of his own in the 7th.  But San Diego won the game 2-1 when Khalil Greene scored on Terrmel Sledge's single. San Diego's victory gave them a half game lead over the Dodgers in the N.L. West.

The last game of the series on September 18 was a rocky start for the Dodgers. Brad Penny gave up four runs in the first inning, giving San Diego a 4-0 lead. Los Angeles slowly climbed back into the game, and tied the score 4-4 in the third inning. Neither team scored again until San Diego scored two in the top of the 8th to take a 6-4 lead. The Dodgers would cut San Diego's lead to one run after Wilson Betemit drove in Marlon Anderson with an RBI single.  San Diego scored three runs in the top of the 9th and appeared to have broken the game wide open with a 9-5 lead. With a four-run lead, San Diego elected to bring in Jon Adkins to pitch the 9th instead of closer Trevor Hoffman, who at the time was just three saves shy of tying the all-time record. Jeff Kent and J. D. Drew hit back-to-back home runs off of Adkins to close the lead to 9–7 with nobody out. San Diego then elected to bring Hoffman in to finish the game. Hoffman however, gave up back-to-back home runs to Martin and Anderson on the first two pitches Hoffman threw, tying the score at 9–9. It was only the fourth time a team hit four consecutive home runs in an inning, and the first time since the Minnesota Twins did so in 1964. San Diego scored a run in the top of the 10th on Josh Bard's RBI single to take a 10-9 lead. However, after Kenny Lofton walked, Nomar Garciaparra hit the game-winning two-run walk off home run. The Dodgers' 11–10 victory gave them a half game lead over San Diego with just two weeks left in the season.

San Diego and Los Angeles finished the season tied for first place in the NL West at 88–74. San Diego, however, was awarded the division title because they had won 13 of 18 games from Los Angeles during the regular season, giving the Dodgers the wild card spot.

Opening Day lineup

Notable transactions
April 24, 2006: Acquired Ben Kozlowski from the Cincinnati Reds for Cody Ross.
June 27, 2006: Acquired Mark Hendrickson, Toby Hall and cash from the Tampa Bay Devil Rays for Jae Seo, Dioner Navarro and Justin Ruggiano.
July 23, 2006: Acquired B.J. LaMura from the Chicago White Sox for Sandy Alomar Jr.
July 25, 2006: Acquired Elmer Dessens from the Kansas City Royals for Odalis Pérez, Blake Johnson, Julio Pimentel and cash.
July 28, 2006: Acquired Wilson Betemit from the Atlanta Braves for Danys Báez, Willy Aybar and cash.
July 31, 2006: Acquired Greg Maddux and cash from the Chicago Cubs for César Izturis.
July 31, 2006: Acquired Julio Lugo from the Tampa Bay Devil Rays for Joel Guzman and Sergio Pedroza.
August 31, 2006: Acquired Marlon Anderson from the Washington Nationals with cash for Jhonny Núñez.

Roster

Starting Pitchers stats
Note: G = Games pitched; GS = Games started; IP = Innings pitched; W/L = Wins/Losses; ERA = Earned run average; BB = Walks allowed; SO = Strikeouts; CG = Complete games

Relief Pitchers stats
Note: G = Games pitched; GS = Games started; IP = Innings pitched; W/L = Wins/Losses; ERA = Earned run average; BB = Walks allowed; SO = Strikeouts; SV = Saves

Batting Stats
Note: Pos = Position; G = Games played; AB = At bats; Avg. = Batting average; R = Runs scored; H = Hits; HR = Home runs; RBI = Runs batted in; SB = Stolen bases

2006 National League Division Series

Upon entering the playoffs, they were swept at Shea Stadium. Reliever Joe Beimel cut his hand on glass at a bar while drinking. Beimel told his teammates, he did it in his hotel room but then later revealed the truth. Beimel was sidelined during all of the Division Series.

Game 1, October 4
Shea Stadium, Flushing Meadows, Queens, New York

Game 2, October 5
Shea Stadium, Flushing Meadows, Queens, New York

Game 3, October 7
Dodger Stadium, Los Angeles

2006 Awards
2006 Major League Baseball All-Star Game
Brad Penny starting pitcher
Nomar Garciaparra reserve
MLB Comeback Player of the Year Award
Nomar Garciaparra
Gold Glove Award
Greg Maddux
Pitcher of the Month
Derek Lowe (August 2006)
Branch Rickey Award
Tommy Lasorda

Farm system

Major League Baseball Draft

The Dodgers selected 50 players in this draft. Of those, seven of them would eventually play Major League baseball. The Dodgers gained an extra first round pick and a supplemental first round pick as a result of losing pitcher Jeff Weaver to the Angels. They also lost their second and third round picks as a result of their signing free agents Rafael Furcal and Bill Mueller.

The top draft pick was left-handed pitcher Clayton Kershaw from Highland Park High School in University Park, Texas.  Kershaw would win the 2014 NL MVP Award as well as multiple Cy Young Awards. He also pitched a no-hitter and led the league in ERA for four straight seasons.

The other first round picks were right-handed pitcher Bryan Morris from Motlow State Community College and shortstop Preston Mattingly from Central High School. Morris was part of the Dodgers 2008 trade for Manny Ramirez and eventually made it to the Majors. Mattingly, the son of All-Star first baseman and later Dodgers manager Don Mattingly never panned out. He hit just .232 in 463 minor league games over six seasons before he was eventually released.

References

External links 
2006 Los Angeles Dodgers uniform
Los Angeles Dodgers official web site
Baseball-Reference season page
Baseball Almanac season page

Los Angeles Dodgers seasons
Los Angeles Dodgers
Los Angeles Dodgers